Jagannath Prasad is a small semi-urban town in Odisha, India. Jagannath Prasad is located on State Highway No.21, connecting Bhanjanagar to Nayagarh.

Demographics
As of 2011 India census, Jagannathprasad had a population of 4,527. Males constitute 50.98% of the population (i.e. 2308) and females 49.02% (i.e. 2219). 10.13% of the population (i.e. 459) is under 6 years of age.

Jagannath Prasad Block
List of all towns and Villages in JAGANNATH PRASAD Block of Ganjam district, Odisha with population details according to 2011 census data.

Geography
Latitude	19.9406685
Longitude	84.9125509
It is in the 11 m elevation(altitude) above sea level.

Weather and Climate
Jagannathprasad is hot in summer, the highest day temperature ranges between 30°C to 37°C. The average temperature of January is 23 °C , February is 24°C, March is 28°C, April is 30°C, May is 31°C.

Famous places
The following are popular recreational spots of Jagannathprasad:
Lankagada Dam (Picnic Spot)
 Rani Gonda Water Reservoir
 Raghunath Jiu Temple
 Sri Dadhibaman Jiu & Jagannath Temple

Transport
It is perfectly connected by all channels of transport with other major cities of Odisha, such as the Capital City Bhubaneswar and the Silk City Berhampur.
 By rail : Berhampur is the nearest railway station which is about 110 km from Jagannath Prasad town. 
 By air : Biju Patnaik International Airport, BBSR is about 140 km far from the town. 
 By bus : As mentioned above it is properly connected by road with other cities of Odisha. Bhanjanagar(one of the 3 Sub-divisions of Ganjam district) is the main town very close to JNP. Buses are coming from every corners of Odisha.

Banks
 Indian Bank, Jagannath Prasad (IFSC Code : IDIB000J001 , MICR Code: 761019009) 
 State Bank Of India, Jagannath Prasad (IFSC Code : SBIN0012113 , MICR Code: 760002508)
 Utkal Grameen Bank, Jagannath Prasad (IFSC Code : SBIN0RRUKGB)
 The Aska Coop Central Bank Limited (IFSC Code : UTIB0SASKAC)

ATMs
 SBI ATM onsite
 SBI ATM offsite
 Indian Bank ATM
 HDFC Bank ATM

Education institutions in Jagannath Prasad

Elementary and Higher Secondary Schools
Nodal U.P. School, Jagannath Prasad
Judhisthir Bidyapitha (Boys' High School)
N.P. Girls' High School
Odisha Adarsha Vidyalaya, Jagannath Prasad (located at Jamagarada, 5 km from JNP)
Apart from the above schools, there are 3 more Govt. U.P. schools and 4 private schools

Colleges
 Anchalika Higher Secondary School (+2 Arts, Science, Commerce)
Government Vocational Higher Secondary School (+2EDA & OM)
 Anchalika Degree Mahavidyalaya (+3 Arts)

References

Cities and towns in Ganjam district